WebYeshiva.org is a pioneering 

 
online yeshiva and midrasha. 
It is unique in that its classes are presented live, and are fully interactive, replicating the structure of a traditional shiur. 
Its offering extends through Semicha (Rabbinic ordination).
It was founded in November 2007 by Rabbi Chaim Brovender
 
and is directed by Rabbi Jeffrey Saks.

WebYeshiva is a project of the Academy for Torah Initiatives and Directions (ATID). 
It is headquartered on HaNassi St., in Jerusalem, near the President's House.

Structure and approach
The Yeshiva's goal is to offer Torah classes to students around the world via the internet;

it draws on the large resource of quality teachers with high levels of study and knowledge in and around Jerusalem.

WebYeshiva offers advanced course-based Torah study for men and women,
 
including classes in Talmud (4 levels offered), Tanach (Bible), Halacha (Jewish law), Chassidut, and Machshava (Jewish philosophy);
some are offered in various languages (Hungarian, Spanish, Russian, Hebrew, Yiddish).
Its offering thus replicates that of a traditional Yeshiva; see .

Students may learn live, fully interacting with the teacher and other students. 
For students who cannot attend live, all classes are recorded in several formats (mp3, mp4, WebEx) and archived within 24 hours. This gives students the option of downloading the classes and learning on their own time.

Programs
In 2010, WebYeshiva launched TorahTutors.org, which aimed to create programs fitted to the needs of the user, including professionals looking for chavruta (learning partner) study, Jewish day school students requiring a tutor for Torah subjects, or Jewish homeschooling.

In 2013, WebYeshiva launched an advanced track, the "Halacha Mastery Program",
 
focused on in-depth study of the major practical halachic topics  - Shabbat, Kashrut, Niddah, Avelut - with their sources. 
The program is offered to men and women with a sufficient background, and spans three-years (it is tuition-based; courses may be taken either synchronously over three years or via self-paced archive study). 
It comprises six courses (~22 weeks each), three mandatory and three elective, where each requires sitting a midterm and then final examination. 
Students who complete all courses and pass the tests, receive a certificate.

From 2016, male students who complete the Halacha Mastery Program may proceed to an intensive Semicha (ordination) track. 
In 2017 WebYeshiva first gave rabbinical ordination to students completing the track and its requirements; the Semicha certificate is signed by Rabbi Brovender and Rabbi David Fink (see faculty listing below).

The ordination requires students to complete three further examined courses, two Intensive and one Survey:
An intensive course covering the principles underpinning Rabbinic decision making;
Shabbat observance in further, intensive, detail, applying these principles (content mirroring the semicha test of the late Rabbi Zalman Nechemia Goldberg);
Other topics re Shabbat, in survey.

In 2015, WebYeshiva launched an online sofer stam certification program for men. The (discontinued) course was ten weeks, with each session lasting 90 minutes and upon completion of all course materials and passing the exam students may be certified as a Sofer Stam, a Jewish ritual scribe.

Notable partnerships
Webyeshiva partners with the S.Y. Agnon House in Jerusalem by offering courses on the writer's works that are broadcast directly from his residence.

Notable educators

Founders
Rabbi Chaim Brovender is the Rosh Yeshiva of WebYeshiva.org and President of ATID. He is the founding Rosh Yeshiva of Yeshivat Hamivtar and Michlelet Bruria (today, Midreshet Lindenbaum). Rabbi Brovender was one of the first Orthodox Jewish rabbis to teach Talmud to women, and most WebYeshiva classes have both male and female students.
Rabbi Jeffrey Saks is the founding Director of ATID, and as of February 2019 is editor of the journal “Tradition.” He received his bachelor's degree, master's degree, and rabbinical ordination from Yeshiva University.

Other notable faculty
Rabbi David Fink, a well-known and an authoritative posek in Jerusalem. He received his Rabbinic ordination from Yeshivas Itri and the Mir Yeshiva in Jerusalem, and was awarded his Ph.D in Semitic languages and Linguistics from Yale University. He has been actively teaching for more than three decades. 

Rabbi Yitzchak Blau, Rosh Yeshiva of Yeshivat Orayta. He was Rosh Kollel at Yeshivat Shvilei Hatorah, and previously taught at Yeshivat Hamivtar and at the Yeshivah of Flatbush High School. He holds a BA, MA and Semicha from YU / RIETS.

Rabbi Dr. Gidon Rothstein a Rosh Kollel, published author, and Community Rabbi; he holds rabbinical ordination from Yeshiva University and a Ph.D. in Midrash from Harvard University.

Rabbi Shlomo Katz, a well known singer, former chaplain (of Cedars Sinai Hospital), and currently Rabbi of the Shirat David synagogue and learning center in Efrat, Israel. He received his rabbinical ordination from Rabbi Zalman Nechemia Goldberg and from Rabbi Chaim Brovender.

References

External links
WebYeshiva.org Website (English)
WebYeshiva.ru Website (Russian)
WebYeshiva Blog
TorahTutors.org
The Academy for Torah Initiatives and Directions
Halacha Mastery Program website
Semicha site
Educational institutions established in 2007
Orthodox yeshivas in Israel
Israeli educational websites
Judaism websites
2007 establishments in Israel